The Cârpeștii Mici is a right tributary of the river Topa in Romania. It flows into the Topa near Sâmbăta.

References

Rivers of Romania
Rivers of Bihor County